Burgoo is a stew, similar to Irish or Mulligan stew, often served with cornbread or corn muffins.  It is often prepared communally as a social gathering. It is popular as the basis for civic fund-raisers in the American Midwest and South.

Etymology
The term is of uncertain origin, possibly from the combination of the Welsh words for "yeast" and "cabbage".  Oxford English Dictionary lists the origin as "Arabic: būrgu̇l cooked, parched, and crushed wheat, ultimately [from] Turkish bulgur".

History
The first OED reference in English is from 1743 in J. Isham Observ. Hudsons Bay, defined as "a soup or stew made with a variety of meat and vegetables, used especially at outdoor feasts. North American."  A 1753 reference from  Chambers's Cycl. Suppl. reads "Burgoo, a sea-faring dish", likely with associations to the Royal Navy and Merchant Navy (United Kingdom). A 1863 reference to G. A. Sala, Strange Adventures Capt. Dangerous (II.i.15) specifies meat as an ingredient: "[He] had the best Beef and Burgoo at the Skipper's table."

Preparation
Traditional burgoo was made using whatever meats and vegetables were available—sometimes including venison, squirrel, opossum, raccoon, or even game birds—and was often associated with autumn and the harvest season. Today, local barbecue restaurants use a specific meat in their recipes, usually pork, chicken, or mutton, which, along with the spices used, creates a flavor unique to each restaurant.

A typical burgoo is a combination of meats and vegetables: Common meats are pork, chicken, mutton or beef, often hickory-smoked, but other meats are seen occasionally. Common vegetables are lima beans, corn, okra, tomatoes, cabbage and potatoes. Typically, since burgoo is a slow-cooked dish, the starch from the added vegetables results in thickening of the stew. However,  a thickening agent, such as cornmeal, ground beans, whole wheat, or potato starch can be used when cooked in a non-traditional way. In addition, soup bones can be added for taste and thickening.

The ingredients are combined in order of cooking time required, with meat first, vegetables next, and thickening agents as necessary. It is said that a spoon can stand up in a  good burgoo. Cider vinegar, hot sauce, Worcestershire sauce, or chili powder are common condiments.

Regional popularity
Cooking burgoo in Kentucky often serves as a communal effort and social event in which each attendee brings one or more ingredients. In Kentucky and surrounding states such as Indiana, burgoo is often used for school fund-raising. This has been claimed as an invention of the family of Ollie Beard, a former Major League Baseball player.

Many places hold great pride in their burgoo, and it is a common feature in local events. The village of Arenzville, Illinois asserts itself as the home of the world's best burgoo and holds a yearly burgoo festival, as does Chandlerville, Illinois, in Cass County and Utica, Illinois in LaSalle County. Several cities claim to be the burgoo capital of the world, including Lawrenceburg, Kentucky, Owensboro, Kentucky, and Franklin, Illinois. In Brighton, Illinois, a local traditional burgoo is prepared and served annually at the village's summer festival, the Betsey Ann Picnic. In the Kentucky Derby, Burgoo is often served and is considered an iconic dish.

See also
 Booyah, a social stew popular in parts of Minnesota and Wisconsin
 Brunswick stew
 Fish fry, often an event and social group fund raiser
 List of regional dishes of the United States
 List of stews
 List of meat dishes
 Southern Illinois chowder, another kind of social stew

References

External links

 Anderson County, KY Burgoo Festival page
 Owensboro, KY's Burgoo page
 Arenzville, IL's Burgoo page
 Bhodda's Burgoo Ba'aag
 A recipe for burgoo
What is burgoo? 

American stews
Kentucky cuisine
History of American cuisine
Wild game dishes